Rajmundów  is a village in the administrative district of Gmina Łanięta, within Kutno County, Łódź Voivodeship, in the middle of Poland.

References

Villages in Kutno County